Wólka Łukowska  is a village in the administrative district of Gmina Karniewo, within Maków County, Masovian Voivodeship, in east-central Poland.

References

Villages in Maków County